The National Institute of Ophthalmology, India is a hospital in Pune, India.   It was established in 1993.

References

Healthcare in Pune
Hospitals in Maharashtra
Ophthalmology organizations
Eye hospitals in India
1993 establishments in Maharashtra
Hospitals established in 1993